Wadi-al-Salaam is an Islamic cemetery, located in the Shia holy city of Najaf, Iraq. It is the largest cemetery in the world. It also attracts millions of pilgrims annually.

The cemetery is located near the shrine of Ali ibn Abi Talib, the first Shia Imam, as well as the fourth Sunni Caliph. Thus, many Shi'ites in Iraq request that they be buried in this cemetery. As a result of improved transportation methods, Shi'ites from across the globe are (or seek to be) buried in the cemetery. However, burial at the cemetery "means being placed in one of the cemetery's many catacombs." According to an undertaker at the cemetery, each crypt can hold up to 50 bodies. The burial plots are controlled by Marja'.

The Shia traditions

Shia tradition holds that Abraham bought land in Wadi-us-Salaam and that Ali said the Wadi Al-Salaam was a part of heaven. Shia also widely believe that Ali has the power to intercede for the deceased—lessening their suffering—during the passage of their soul from the worldly life and if they are buried there "they will be raised from the dead on judgment day with their spiritual leader."

The Shia are encouraged to bury their dead at the location through religious edicts and the cemetery's expansion is also seen as being a result of Shi'isms "more permissive attitude than Sunnism with regard to the commemoration of the dead and the erection of mausoleums."

Some rituals carried out before burial in the cemetery include: the body is washed and wrapped at the cemetery, the funeral prayers are conducted in the Imam Ali shrine, the deceased is carried around the shrine three times, and some Quranic verses are recited at the cemetery.

History
Daily burials have been on going for over 1,400 years and the site is on the Tentative List of UNESCO's World Heritage sites. Burials in Najaf have been documented as early as the Parthian and Sassanid eras and ancient Mesopotamian cities often had similar cemeteries, where there was an accumulation of tombs.

It is estimated that during the Iraq War about 200 to 250 corpses were buried there daily; however, in 2010 this number had decreased to less than 100. Approximately 50,000 new bodies are interred in the cemetery annually from across the globe. This figure is an increase on the approximately 20,000 bodies, primarily from Iran, that used to be interred annually in the early 20th century. Most Iraqi and many Iranian Shi'ites have a relative buried in the cemetery.

As of 2014—coinciding with conflict against ISIL—it has been reported that burial plots are running out, resulting in many being stolen, illegally resold or improvised. According to one gravedigger: "I've never had it so busy. Not even after 2003 or 2006 [the height of Iraq's civil war]."

Holy sites
 Grand Ayatollah Mohammad Mohammad Sadeq al-Sadr – his mausoleum is possibly the most visited in the cemetery.
 Grave of Grand Ayatollah Muhammad Baqir al-Sadr
 Mosque of Prophet Hud. The mosque and tomb is located at the middle of the cemetery with its blue dome. Prophet Saleh is believed to be buried there as well.
 Maqam Imam Mahdi & Imam Jafar Sadiq

Prominent burials 
 Rais Ali Delvari
 Khalou Hossein Bord Khuni Dashti
 Sayed Ali Qadhi Tabatabaei
 Abdul Hosein Amini
 Leyla Qasim
 
 Amina al-Sadr
 Grand Ayatollah Muhammad Sadeq Al-Sadr
 Grand Ayatollah Muhammad Baqir Al-Sadr
 Hussein Gholi Khan AbuGhaddareh, Vāli/Wāli of Posht-e-Kuh (modern day Ilam, Iran), and father of the last Vāli of Posht-e-Kuh Gholam Reza Khan.
 Other religious figures

Notes and references

External links
 Satellite photograph of the cemetery
 Wadi-us-salaam Photos

 A Drone flying over the Cemetery – http://www.abc.net.au/news/2016-07-13/drone-footage-worlds-largest-cemetery/7625154

Najaf
Cemeteries in Iraq
Shia cemeteries
Arabic architecture
Shia Islam in Iraq
Islamic holy places
Mahdism